Ronald Kiandee (born 10 January 1961) is a Malaysian politician. A member of the Malaysian United Indigenous Party (BERSATU) and its Vice President since August 2020 and 2nd State Chairman of Sabah since December 2022, he has served as the Member of Parliament (MP) for Beluran since November 1999. He served as Minister of Agriculture and Food Industries in the Perikatan Nasional (PN) administration under former Prime Minister Muhyiddin Yassin from March 2020 to the collapse of the PN administration in August 2021. He was reappointed to the same post for a second term in the Barisan Nasional (BN) administration under former Prime Minister Ismail Sabri Yaakob from August 2021 until the dissolution of the BN government in November 2022, when BN lost its reelection campaign in the 2022 general election. Prior to serving in the Cabinet, Kiandee was the Chairman of the Public Accounts Committee (PAC) in the Pakatan Harapan (PH) administration from 2018 to 2019 and Deputy Speaker of the Dewan Rakyat in the BN administration from 2008 to 2018. He is presently the sole Sabah BERSATU MP.

Early life
He holds a Doctor of Philosophy (PhD) in political sociology from Universiti Sains Malaysia.

Political career
Kiandee was elected to Dewan Rakyat first in the 1999 election. He was Deputy Speaker of the Dewan Rakyat from April 2008 until the Barisan Nasional (BN) administration lost its re-election campaign in May 2018. Kiandee then served as chairman of the Public Accounts Committee (PAC) from 2018 to 2019.

Kiandee left United Malays National Organisation (UMNO) in the opposition Barisan Nasional (BN) coalition to become an Independent on 12 December 2018, before later joining BERSATU. After the then chairman of BERSATU Sabah, Hajiji Noor, announced on 10 December 2022 that all MPs and MLAs of BERSATU had quit the party and joined Gabungan Rakyat Sabah (GRS) coalition as a direct member in line of the federal coalition of GRS+PH+BN+ Gabungan Parti Sarawak, Ronald announced he would stay in the party, and succeeded Hajiji as the chairman of BERSATU Sabah and PN Sabah.

Election results

Honours
  :
  Grand Commander of the Order of the Territorial Crown (SMW) - Datuk Seri (2014)
  :
  Commander of the Order of Kinabalu (PGDK) - Datuk (2004)

See also

 Beluran (federal constituency)

References 

Living people
1961 births
People from Sabah
Kadazan-Dusun people
Malaysian Christians
Malaysian United Indigenous Party politicians
Former United Malays National Organisation politicians
Independent politicians in Malaysia
Members of the Dewan Rakyat
Commanders of the Order of Kinabalu
21st-century Malaysian politicians